The phonology of Faroese has an inventory similar to the closely related Icelandic language, but markedly different processes differentiate the two. Similarities include an aspiration contrast in stop consonants, the retention of front rounded vowels and vowel quality changes instead of vowel length distinctions.

Vowels

  and  appear only in loanwords.
  are more open than the corresponding tense vowels, with  being the most open of the three and having the same F1 value as the back .
  and especially  are more open than the phonetically close-mid  (often diphthongized to ). Those diphthongs have considerably more close starting points).
The remaining short mid  is more open than those two, suggesting  as the best narrow transcription.

As with other Germanic languages, Faroese has a large number of vowel phonemes; by one analysis, long and short vowels may be considered separate phonemes, with 26 in total. Vowel distribution is similar to other North Germanic languages in that short vowels appear in closed syllables (those ending in consonant clusters or long consonants) and long vowels appearing in open syllables.

Faroese avoids having a hiatus between two vowels by inserting a glide between them.

There is considerable variation among dialects in the pronunciation of vowels.

The only unstressed vowels in Faroese are short ; these appear in inflectional endings: áðrenn (e.g. 'before'). Very typical are endings like -ur, -ir, -ar.
  – bátar  ('boats'), kallar  ('[you] call')
  – gestir  ('guests'), dugir  ('[you] can')
  – bátur  ('boat'), gentur  ('girls'), rennur  ('[you] run').

This can cause spelling mistakes related to these two vowels. The following table displays the different realizations in different dialects.

Skerping

The so-called "skerping" ( 'sharpening') is a typical phenomenon of fronting back vowels before  and monophthongizing certain diphthongs before long . Skerping is not indicated orthographically.
: Jógvan  (a form of the name John), gjógv  ('cleft')
: kúgv  ('cow'), trúgva  ('believe'), but: trúleysur  ('faithless')
: heyggjur  ('high'), but heygnum  ('high [dat. sg.]')
: nýggjur  ('new [M.]'), but nýtt  ('New [Nn.]')
: beiggi  ('brother')
: oyggj  ('island'), but oynna  ('island [acc. sg.]')

Consonants

  are normally labiodental, but may sometimes be bilabial. Intervocalic  is normally an approximant , whereas word-initial  varies between an approximant  and a fricative .
  is dental , whereas  vary between being dental  and (less commonly) alveolar .
 Initial  is dental  or alveolar . Postvocalic  may be more of a postalveolar lateral , especially after back vowels.
  are palato-alveolar, and vary between stops  and affricates .
  are velar, whereas  is glottal.

There are several phonological processes involved in Faroese, including:

 Liquid consonants are devoiced before voiceless consonants
 Nasal consonants generally assume the place of articulation and laryngeal settings of following consonants.
 Velar stop consonants palatalize to postalveolar affricates before .
  becomes devoiced to  before voiceless consonants
  before another consonant becomes  after 
  becomes  before  (but in morphological forms often  word internally, i.e. elski  'I love')
  retroflexes itself as well as following consonants in consonant clusters, yielding the allophones  while  itself becomes , example:  ; preaspirated consonants devoice the rhotic: example:  ;  is usually  (only in some loanwords ).
 Intervocalically the aspirated consonants become pre-aspirated unless followed by a closed vowel. In clusters, the preaspiration merges with a preceding nasal or apical approximant, rendering them voiceless, example:

Omissions in consonant clusters
Faroese tends to omit the first or second consonant in clusters of different consonants:
Other examples for genitives are: barns  ('child's'), vatns  ('water's').
Other examples for past forms are: sigldi  ('sailed'), yrkti  ('wrote poetry').
 homophone are fylgdi ('followed') and fygldi ('caught birds with a net'): .
 skt will be:
  in words of more than one syllable: føroyskt  ('Faroese' .); russiskt  ('Russian' .); íslendskt  ('Icelandic' .).
  in monosyllables: enskt  ('English' .); danskt  ('Danish' .); franskt  ('French' .); spanskt  ('Spanish' .); svenskt  ('Swedish' .); týskt  ('German' .).
 However  in: írskt  ('Irish' .), norskt  ('Norwegian' .)

References

Bibliography

Further reading

 
 
 
 

Phonology
Germanic phonologies